Solem is a Norwegian surname. As of 2013, there were 1,926 people with this surname in Norway.

Notable people
Notable people with this surname include:
 Alan Solem (1931–1990), American malacologist
 Arent Solem (1777-1857), Norwegian merchant and Haugean
 Erik Solem (1877–1949), Norwegian judge
 Jeff Solem (born 1948), American football player
 Johndale Solem (born 1941), American physicist
 Kari Solem (born 1974), Norwegian handball player
 Morten Solem (born 1980), Norwegian ski jumper
 Ossie Solem (1891-1986), American football coach
 Phil Solem (born 1956), American musician
 Randi Solem (1775-1859), Norwegian religious leader
 Rolf Solem (1917–2011), Norwegian jurist
 Quinn Solem (born 1962), American Business leader
 Jacob Solem (1998-Present),
American investor and banking CEO (youngest CEO in the U.S. banking industry)

References